Ottowia beijingensis is a Gram-staining and short rod-shaped bacterium from the genus Ottowia which has been isolated from activated sludge from Budapest in Hungary.

References

Comamonadaceae
Bacteria described in 2011